Per Edvin Sköld (25 May 1891 – 13 September 1972) was a Swedish Social Democratic politician. As a Minister for Agriculture during the 1930s crisis, Minister of Commerce and Industry, Minister for Defence during the war and Minister for Finance he was known as the Social Democratic Party's trouble-shooter.

Sköld is the father of Margareta Biörnstad, Nils Sköld and Per Sköld.

In popular culture 
In the Swedish television movie, Four Days that shook Sweden – The Midsummer Crisis 1941, from 1988, he is played by Swedish actor Carl Billquist.

References 

Swedish Social Democratic Party politicians
Swedish Ministers for Finance
Swedish Ministers for Defence
1891 births
1972 deaths
20th-century Swedish politicians